"Life Is a Highway" is a song by Canadian musician Tom Cochrane from his second studio album, Mad Mad World (1991). The song became a number-one hit in Canada in late 1991. "Life Is a Highway" also peaked at number six on the US Billboard Hot 100 chart in August 1992 and reached the top three in Australia and New Zealand the same year. The song was covered by Chris LeDoux for his 1998 album One Road Man and Rascal Flatts for the Cars soundtrack.

Background and release
Cochrane has stated that "Life Is a Highway" was originally conceived in the 1980s as "Love is a Highway" while he was still a member of Red Rider, but was shelved at that time because he felt the unfinished song was unusable. Following a trip with his family to Eastern Africa with the World Vision famine relief organization, Cochrane revisited the song on the advice of his friend John Webster, an instrumentalist on the Mad Mad World album. In a 2017 interview with The Canadian Press to mark the song's 25th anniversary, Cochrane said Webster encouraged him to revisit the demo recording, which at that point only had mumbled vocals and improvised lyrics, but not the song's well-known chorus. "(The song) became a pep talk to myself... saying you can’t really control all of this stuff, you just do the best you can," he says. Cochrane says he was trying to make sense of the poverty he witnessed on his trip, which he found "shocking and traumatic".

Eventually, the original demo version was released on the 25th-anniversary reissue of Mad Mad World under the original title "Love is a Highway". He later said the uptempo spirit of the song came from looking for something positive to "hang the experience on." Most of the vocals on the track were recorded in Cochrane's small home studio. The song was Cochrane's only top-40 hit in the United States, reaching number six on the Billboard Hot 100. In Canada, the song stayed at number one for two weeks, and three other singles from the album charted within the top 10; "No Regrets" peaked at number three, "Sinking Like a Sunset" reached number two, and "Washed Away" climbed to number seven. In Australia and New Zealand, the single peaked at number two in both countries. Elsewhere, it became a top-40 hit in Germany, the Netherlands, and Sweden.

Music video
The video for "Life Is a Highway" was directed by David Storey and produced by Albert Botha, who went on to be the line producer on two films for Saturday Night Live: Superstar starring Molly Shannon and The Ladies Man starring Tim Meadows. The video was shot in Alberta's Badlands, near the town of Drumheller. Many of the shots are in familiar locations along the Dinosaur Trail, including Cochrane playing guitar amid the Hoodoos and the couple, Kait Shane and Brennan Elliott, running around the car while it rides the Bleriot Ferry across the Red Deer River. It also features an older man (gas station attendant), a couple (tall man, short wife), two women (Jacqueline and Joyce Robbins) from an Anabaptist religious order (Alberta has a population of Hutterites), and two First Nations men, one wearing a baseball cap with the words "Oka Standoff" printed on it, referring to the Oka Crisis (a land dispute between a group of Mohawk people and the town of Oka, Quebec). The car featured in the music video is a 1965 Chevrolet Impala Super Sport.

Charts

Weekly charts

Year-end charts

Decade-end charts

Certifications

Release history

Chris LeDoux version

In 1998, Chris LeDoux covered "Life Is a Highway" for his album One Road Man. Changes include the intro, timing of vocal entrances on the chorus, and location names between the first and second chorus. LeDoux's version was released as a single the following year and peaked at number 64 on the Billboard Hot Country Songs chart during the week of June 12, 1999, and remained at the spot for nine weeks.

Music video
The music video for the song, directed by Michael Salomon, takes place on multiple roads and highways as well as a blue and red static themed room. When on roads and highways, there is a chance for LeDoux to appear on a television that is sitting on a sidewalk or grass, however, while the background behind LeDoux (that appears on the TV) is the same background as everything behind the TV itself, LeDoux does not appear to be standing behind the TV. In most locations, LeDoux is walking down a road as at the start of the music video. The video ends with LeDoux singing the chorus while appearing on a flap-down TV inside of someone's car, then transitioning to LeDoux being once again in the static room and then walking out of it. After LeDoux leaves the room, the screen slowly fades to black and the video ends.

Charts

Rascal Flatts version

In 2005, American country band Rascal Flatts recorded a cover of the song for the Pixar animated film Cars, which was released on June 9, 2006. The song sold a large quantity of digital downloads, leading to a number seven peak on the Billboard Hot 100 (one position lower than Cochrane's original version). In addition, the cover was placed as a bonus track on later versions of the album Me and My Gang, and also was included on Greatest Hits Volume 1 and Twenty Years of Rascal Flatts: The Greatest Hits. This version also won the "Favorite Song from a Movie" award at the 33rd People's Choice Awards.

The instrumental of the Rascal Flatts' cover version was prominently featured in the Top Gear: US Special, which aired February 11, 2007. The song is included on the soundtrack for Lego Rock Band. It topped the two million mark in paid downloads as of the chart dated March 28, 2009. As of March 2013, the song has sold over three million copies in the US. On July 14, 2015, Scott Walker, Republican Governor of Wisconsin, launched his presidential campaign as Republican Party nominee in Waukesha, Wisconsin using the song. On December 8, 2020, Harmonix announced that the cover will be featured on the video game, FUSER, as a DLC on December 10, 2020.

Music video
The music video portrays the three band members pulling into a drive-in theater driving three vintage vehicles. The cars allude to three characters from Cars: Lightning McQueen, Doc Hudson and Mater. As the projector rolls, scenes from the film are shown as the band plays through the number. It was directed by Shaun Silva.

Charts
The Rascal Flatts version subsequently became a hit on the US Billboard Hot 100 chart, where it peaked at number seven. Even though it was not officially released to country radio, many country stations played the song as an album cut, overlapping with their then-current country single "My Wish". The unsolicited country airplay brought "Life Is a Highway" to number 18 on the US Hot Country Songs chart. The song has sold 3.4 million copies in the US as of June 2016.

Weekly charts

Year-end charts

Certifications

References

External links
 Tom Cochrane "Life Is A Highway" Song Story at  tomcochranesite.com
 Tom Cochrane "Life Is a Highway" music video at YouTube
 Chris LeDoux "Life Is a Highway" music video at YouTube
 Rascal Flatts "Life Is a Highway" music video at YouTube

1991 songs
1991 singles
1999 singles
2006 singles
Tom Cochrane songs
Rascal Flatts songs
Music videos directed by Shaun Silva
Song recordings produced by Dann Huff
RPM Top Singles number-one singles
Songs written by Tom Cochrane
Songs about cars
Capitol Records Nashville singles
Lyric Street Records singles
Walt Disney Records singles
Juno Award for Single of the Year singles